Shining Soul (Chinese: 闪魂) is a 2014 Chinese crime thriller film directed by Dai Wei.

Cast
Si Ligeng
Chen Yuan
Dai Wei

Reception
The film grossed US$0.8 million in China.

References

2014 films
2014 crime thriller films
Chinese crime thriller films
2010s Mandarin-language films